Douglas Craig Emhoff (born October 13, 1964) is an American lawyer who is the second gentleman of the United States. He is married to the 49th vice president of the United States, Kamala Harris. As the first-ever husband of a vice president, Emhoff is the first second gentleman in American history. He is also the first Jewish spouse of a vice president.

Emhoff began his career as an entertainment lawyer. He was managing director of Venable's West Coast offices and later became a partner at DLA Piper. He is also a distinguished visiting professor at Georgetown University Law Center.

Early life and education
Douglas Craig Emhoff was born on October 13, 1964 in the New York City borough of Brooklyn, the son of Jewish parents, Barbara (nee Kanzer) and Michael Emhoff. He has a brother Andy and a sister Jamie. From 1969 to 1981, he grew up in Matawan and Old Bridge Township, New Jersey, and attended Cedar Ridge High School. His family were congregants of Temple Shalom, a Reform synagogue in Aberdeen Township, at which Emhoff became a bar mitzvah in 1977. The following summer, in 1978, Emhoff attended Camp Cedar Lake in Milford, Pennsylvania, where he was voted "most athletic" of his division at age 13. When he was 17, he moved with his family to Southern California, where he graduated from Agoura High School. He earned a Bachelor of Arts degree from California State University, Northridge and a Juris Doctor from the USC Gould School of Law in 1990.

Career
Emhoff is an entertainment litigator and began his career at Pillsbury Winthrop's litigation group. He moved to Belin Rawlings & Badal, a boutique firm, in the late 1990s. He opened his own firm with Ben Whitwell in 2000, which was acquired by Venable LLP in 2006. His clients included Walmart and Merck, and he became managing director of Venable's West Coast offices.

Emhoff joined DLA Piper as a partner in 2017, working at its Washington, D.C., and California offices. Following the announcement that his wife would be Joe Biden's running mate in the 2020 United States presidential election, Emhoff took a leave of absence from the firm. Following the Biden–Harris ticket's win, the campaign announced Emhoff would permanently leave DLA Piper prior to Inauguration Day to avoid conflict of interest concerns.

In December 2020, Georgetown University Law Center announced that Emhoff would join the school's faculty as a distinguished visitor and as a distinguished fellow of the school's Institute for Technology Law and Policy.

Second Gentleman of the United States

Emhoff's wife, Kamala Harris, was a candidate in the 2020 Democratic Party presidential primaries before dropping out in December 2019. In August 2020, Harris was announced as Joe Biden's running mate for the presidential election, making Emhoff the third man in U.S. history to be a spouse of the vice presidential candidate of a major party, following John Zaccaro (widower of Geraldine Ferraro) and Todd Palin (ex-spouse of Sarah Palin). When Harris assumed office, Emhoff became the first second gentleman of the United States. He is also the first Jewish spouse of a U.S. vice president. Following this, Emhoff was popularly labeled as a "wife guy", an online slang term referring to a man whose fame is owed to his wife (or content posted about his wife), or one who is exceptionally supportive of his wife. In 2020, Emhoff referred to himself as a wife guy on Twitter.

In his role as Second Gentleman, Emhoff plans to focus on equal access to justice and legal representation.

In March 2021, while Second Gentleman, Emhoff began teaching a course entitled "Entertainment Law Disputes" at the Georgetown University Law Center. Emhoff said he respected educators as he had "learned [that] teaching is really hard", saying he has "so much respect for the teachers out there doing this each and every day".

Emhoff has led the U.S. delegations to several diplomatic events, including the opening ceremony of the 2020 Summer Paralympics in Tokyo and the inaugurations of South Korean president Yoon Suk-yeol and Philippine president Bongbong Marcos.

In March 2022, Emhoff tested positive for COVID-19.

In July 2022, Emhoff travelled to Oregon to participate in the opening ceremonies of the 2022 World Athletics Championships, held in Eugene, Oregon.

In response to a November 2022 meeting involving former president Donald Trump, Kanye West, and Nick Fuentes, the White House announced that a round table on antisemitism would be led by the Second Gentleman. It was held on December 7, 2022 and included many Jewish leaders, namely representatives from the Anti-Defamation League.

Personal life
Emhoff was married for 16 years to Kerstin Emhoff, née Mackin. They have two children, Cole and Ella. He married Kamala Harris on August 22, 2014, in Santa Barbara, California, with Kamala's sister Maya Harris officiating. As of August 2019, Emhoff and Harris had an estimated net worth of $5.8million. The couple temporarily resided at Blair House, the official guest house of the President, while the official residence of the Vice President Number One Observatory Circle underwent maintenance and renovation at the beginning of Harris's term. They also maintain homes in San Francisco, Washington, D.C. and the Brentwood neighborhood of Los Angeles.

References

External links

 Douglas Emhoff on White House website
 

1964 births
21st-century American lawyers
American entertainment lawyers
California lawyers
California State University, Northridge alumni
Georgetown University Law Center faculty
Harris family
Jewish American attorneys
Lawyers from Brooklyn
Living people
People from Agoura Hills, California
People from Matawan, New Jersey
People from Old Bridge Township, New Jersey
Second gentlemen of the United States
Spouses of California politicians
USC Gould School of Law alumni